Amphastar Pharmaceuticals is a publicly traded American speciality pharmaceutical company. It was incorporated in May 2004 and primarily develops, manufactures, and sells inhalation and intranasal products.

One of its products is naloxone, an injectable generic drug that treats opioid overdose, and the company was criticized when it doubled the price of the drug from around $20 to $40 in 2015 during the opioid epidemic. In February 2017, the FDA rejected the company's application to market a device that delivers naloxone intranasally.

In March 2018, the company won a patent infringement lawsuit brought against it by Momenta Pharmaceuticals and Sandoz Inc in an ongoing antitrust case.

See also
 List of S&P 600 companies

References 

Pharmaceutical companies of the United States
Health care companies based in California

External links